Araeodelphis is an extinct genus of river dolphin from the early Miocene of the US Eastern Seaboard.

Fossils
Remains of Araeodelphis are known from the early Miocene Burdigalian-age Plum Point Member of the Calvert Formation in Maryland.

Phylogeny
Cladistic analysis by Godfrey et al. (2017) recovers Araeodelphis as basal to the South Asian river dolphin the platanistid subfamily Pomatodelphinae.

References

River dolphins
Prehistoric toothed whales
Miocene cetaceans
Fossil taxa described in 1957